Myat Myat Ohn Khin (born 1948 in Rangoon, Burma) is the former Minister for Social Welfare, Relief and Resettlement. She was sworn in on 7 September 2012, becoming the first Burmese woman in President Thein Sein's Cabinet. Myat Myat Ohn Khin was an Upper House representative and a former Deputy Minister for Health. 

She was awarded the title "Agga Maha Thiri Thudhamma Theingi" in 2008. In April 2016, she was awarded the title "Thiri Pyanchi" by the President of Myanmar for her outstanding performances for the people of Myanmar.

References

Government ministers of Myanmar
Living people
1948 births
People from Yangon
Social affairs ministers
Women government ministers of Myanmar